The Slaten-LaMarsh House is a historic house located at 25 E. Main St. in Grafton, Illinois. The house was built circa 1840 for D.C. Slaten, the first mayor of Grafton. The house has a side hall plan, a design featuring a hall on one side and rooms connected by the hall on the other. It is a rare -story side-hall plan house, as other houses using the plan in Grafton are all two stories. Locally quarried limestone was used to build the house; at the time of its construction, Grafton limestone was only used to build structures within the city, though it later became a widespread building material in the region. The limestone blocks on the front facade are visibly more ashlar than those on the sides, a masonry choice which gives the front corners a quoin-like appearance.

The house was added to the National Register of Historic Places on February 16, 1994.

References

Houses on the National Register of Historic Places in Illinois
Houses completed in 1840
Houses in Jersey County, Illinois
National Register of Historic Places in Jersey County, Illinois